Rivellia winifredae is a species of signal flies (insects in the family Platystomatidae). It is found associated with Apios americana.

References

Further reading

 

winifredae
Articles created by Qbugbot
Insects described in 1956